Gerry Glacier is a glacier on Edward VII Peninsula, Antarctica, flowing north between Reeves Peninsula and the Howard Heights to the head of Sulzberger Bay. Features in this area were photographed from the air and mapped by the Byrd Antarctic Expeditions, 1928–30 and 1933–35. This glacier was mapped by the United States Geological Survey from surveys and U.S. Navy air photos, 1959–65, and was named by the Advisory Committee on Antarctic Names (at the suggestion of Rear Admiral Richard E. Byrd) for U.S. Senator Peter G. Gerry of Rhode Island, a long-time friend of the Byrd family and a contributor to the 1933–35 expedition.

See also
 List of glaciers in the Antarctic
 Glaciology

References

Glaciers of King Edward VII Land